Anomala hualienensis is a species of beetle in the family Scarabaeidae. It was described by Ming-Zhi Zhao in 2022.

Etymology 
The species is named after Hualien County, where the type material was collected.

Distribution 
This species can be found in Taiwan.

References 

Rutelinae
Beetles described in 2022